Soup of Life (simplified Chinese: 砂煲肉骨茶), is a Malaysian television drama series. It stars Yao Wen Long, Ann Kok, Belinda Lee, Terence Cao, Nat Ho, Zhou Ying and Lin Mei Jiao as the main characters in the story. The executive producers are Yeo Saik Pin and Joe Ma. The story revolves around the lives of the stall owners and employees of a coffesshop made up of different food stalls.

It was broadcast on MediaCorp Channel 8 in Singapore from 5 February 2014 to 11 March 2014. A total of 25 episodes were aired during this period.

Episodes

References

See also
Soup of Life
List of MediaCorp Channel 8 Chinese Drama Series (2010s)

Lists of Singaporean television series episodes
Lists of Malaysian television series episodes
Lists of soap opera episodes